Alegrías is a flamenco palo or musical form, which has a rhythm consisting of 12 beats. It is similar to Soleares. Its beat emphasis is as follows: 1 2 [3] 4 5 [6] 7 [8] 9 [10] 11 [12]. Alegrías originated in Cádiz. Alegrías belongs to the group of palos called Cantiñas and it is usually played in a lively rhythm (120-170 beats per minute). The livelier speeds are chosen for dancing, while quieter rhythms are preferred for the song alone.

One of the structurally strictest forms of flamenco, a traditional dance in alegrías must contain each of the following sections: a salida (entrance), paseo (walkaround), silencio (similar to an adagio in ballet), castellana (upbeat section)  zapateado (literally "a tap of the foot") and bulerías. This structure though, is not followed when alegrías are sung as a standalone song (with no dancing). In that case, the stanzas are combined freely, sometimes together with other types of cantiñas.

Recommended listenings for this palo include most singers from Cádiz, like Chano Lobato, La Perla de Cádiz, Aurelio Sellé, but also general singers like Manolo Caracol or La Niña de los Peines.

Also, you can listen "Mar Amargo" from Camarón and "La Tarde es Caramelo" from Vicente Amigo.

It is one of the cante chico forms of flamenco. The word Alegrías literally means "joys."

Sources
ÁLVAREZ CABALLERO, Ángel: La discoteca ideal del flamenco, Editorial Planeta, Barcelona, 1995

External links 
Flamenco Institute Flora Albaicín. Flamenco dance company and academy (the oldest and biggest of its kind in the world).
Get to know the flamenco forms: alegrías
Flamenco Forum

Flamenco styles
Spanish music
Andalusian music
Spanish dances
Spanish folk music